is the 36th single by Japanese entertainer Miho Nakayama. Written by Nakayama, Masato Odake and Yūko Ōtaki, the single was released on June 4, 1997, by King Records.

The single peaked at No. 29 on Oricon's weekly singles chart and sold over 25,000 copies.

Track listing

Charts

References

External links

1997 singles
1997 songs
Japanese-language songs
Miho Nakayama songs
King Records (Japan) singles